Olga Vyalikova (26 March 1954 – 15 July 2019) was a Russian film and theater actress. She graduated from the Boris Schukin Theatre Institute in 1975.

Filmography
1978 — Любовь моя, печаль моя 
1978 — An Ordinary Miracle
1982 — Похождения графа Невзорова 
1983 — И жизнь, и слёзы, и любовь 
2004 — Долгое прощание

References

External links

1954 births
2019 deaths
Russian actresses